The Michaelis Ranch is a historic cattle ranch located near Kyle, Texas, United States. The ranch was founded by Max G. Michaelis Sr. in the late 1890s, and is listed in the National Register of Historic Places.
The ranch was known in the early 20th century as one of the largest producers of donkeys in the United States, and became famous in the 1930s for introducing Charolais cattle to the United States. The ranch was also home to Helen Michaelis, the first woman inducted into the American Quarter Horse Hall of Fame.

See also

National Register of Historic Places listings in Hays County, Texas

References

Buildings and structures in Hays County, Texas
Historic districts on the National Register of Historic Places in Texas
Houses completed in 1898
Ranches on the National Register of Historic Places in Texas
National Register of Historic Places in Hays County, Texas